Castelnuovo del Garda is a railway station serving Castelnuovo del Garda, in the region of Lombardy, northern Italy. The station lies on the Milan–Venice railway and the train services are operated by Trenitalia and Trenord.

Train services
The station is served by the following services:

Regional services (Treno regionale) Brescia - Desanzano del Garda - Peschiera del Garda - Verona
Regional services (Treno regionale) Brescia - Verona - Vicenza - Padua - Venice (1x per day)

See also

History of rail transport in Italy
List of railway stations in Lombardy
Rail transport in Italy
Railway stations in Italy

References

External links

This article is based upon a translation of the Italian language version as at October 2015.

Province of Verona
Railway stations in Lombardy